Kubo and the Two Strings is a 2016 American stop-motion action-adventure film directed by Travis Knight and produced by Laika. The screenplay, written by Marc Haimes and Chris Butler, revolves around Kubo, a 12-year-old boy with an eyepatch. Kubo's left eye was stolen in infancy, and he must subdue his corrupt family members now coming to get the other eye. The film features the voices of Charlize Theron, Art Parkinson, Ralph Fiennes, Rooney Mara, George Takei, and Matthew McConaughey.

The film premiered at the Melbourne International Film Festival on August 13, 2016. Focus Features released it theatrically on September 9. Worldwide, the film grossed nearly $70 million on a $60 million budget. On the review aggregator Rotten Tomatoes, Kubo and the Two Strings holds a rating of 97%, based on 192 reviews, with an average rating of 8.4/10.

Kubo and the Two Strings garnered awards and nominations in a general animated film category at several award ceremonies. At the 89th Academy Awards, it was nominated in the categories Best Animated Feature and Best Visual Effects; it was the second animated film to be nominated in the latter category, following The Nightmare Before Christmas (1993). It was nominated for Best Animated Feature Film at the 74th Golden Globe Awards and Best Animated Feature at the 22nd Critics' Choice Awards. The film received the second-most nominations at the 44th Annie Awards, one fewer than Zootopia 11, and won Outstanding Achievement in Character Animation, Production Design, and Editorial in an Animated Feature Production, with seven other nominations.

Kubo and the Two Strings was named best animated feature film at the 12th Austin Film Critics Association Awards, the 29th Chicago Film Critics Association Awards, the 70th British Academy Film Awards, the 21st Florida Film Critics Circle Awards, the 10th Houston Film Critics Society Awards, the 88th National Board of Review Awards, the 20th Online Film Critics Society Awards, the 21st San Diego Film Critics Society Awards, and the 15th Washington D.C. Area Film Critics Association Awards.

Accolades

References

External links
 

Lists of accolades by film